This is a list of the Fall 1975 PGA Tour Qualifying School graduates. The event was held at three courses at the Walt Disney World Resort: Magnolia Golf Course, Palm Golf Course, and Cypress Creek Golf Club. 375 players made the finals.

Tournament summary 
Two significant international players were in the event. They were Dale Hayes, "a highly regarded players from Pretoria, South Africa," and England's Maurice Bembridge. Hayes opened, well with a 69 (−3), to put himself two back of the lead. Bembridge, however, struggled in the first round with a 76 (+4). Overall, Bobby Stroble and Andy Bean held the joint first round lead at 67 (−5). After the second round, it was Jerry Pate and Sandy Galbraith that were tied for the lead at 139 (−5). Pate went on to earn medallist honors. Among the first round leaders, both Strobble and Bean easily qualified, both finishing in the top ten. Among the international players, Hayes qualified for the tour while Bembridge did not. Meanwhile, Galbraith, the joint leader with Pate after the second round, also qualified.

Jim Thorpe also earned playing privileges on the PGA Tour for the first time. In addition, Bill Mallon, a recent graduate of Duke University, also earned playing privileges. Shortly after he graduated he told The Boston Globe, "I am a touring professional golfer. I did it. Achieved a lifelong dream. I've wanted to be a professional golfer for a long time. I know a lot of good young players who were 15 or 16 and they said this is want they wanted. They want to be a pro when they see Nicklaus or Palmer on TV. Well I said it. And now I've done it. I've got a long way to go to do what I want to do yet. But this is the first step."

List of graduates 

Source:

References 

1975 2
PGA Tour Qualifying School Graduates
PGA Tour Qualifying School Graduates